= Saeed Tayah =

Jordanian poet

- Citizenship: Jordanian
- Occupation: Poet
- Notable work: Poems from the Conscience; A Collection of Poetry in Three Parts; Intimate Poems

Saeed Tayah is a Jordanian poet, the author of a number of poetry collections which have been published, perhaps the most prominent and famous of which is the collection of “Intimate Poems”, others being a “Diwan of Poetry in Three Parts” which included dozens of poems and also a collection of "Poems from Conscience", which was published in 2018 by Zahrat Publishing House.

== Career path ==
Saeed Tayeh published his first published poetry collection entitled “Intimate Poems” through the Ministry of Culture, and a second poetry book titled “A Diwan of Poetry in Three Parts” (Echo of Consciousness, Ashjan, and Fayd Al Khater) was also published. The last Diwan achieved fame in literary circles and was warmly received by some critics. Some of them asserted - in reviews or critical readings - that the poet “wove his poems in a common language that helped a lot by coherence of phrases, and flowed sweetly ... the circulating vocabulary [of the Diwan] is not abnormal and does not concave and There is no strangeness or coarseness, well-known meanings with many connotations, selected wisely to serve the idea and description, and drawing beautiful, innovated images accurately. Saeed focused in this poetry collection on a group of poems that mostly describe the beloved woman and flirt with her and her identity and depict the poet's infatuation with his beloved.

In 2018, the poet Saeed Tayeh published his poetry collection entitled “Poems from Conscience” by Zahrat Publishing House. A critical reading of the book was presented by the Vice President of Al al-Bayt University, Dr. Muhammad Al-Droubi. The Poetic Diwan achieved acceptable sales rates and was praised by critics. This Diwan is considered the fifth Diwan issued after the previous works of Saeed Al-Sharia, and the poems of this Diwan, like the previous Diwans, were formulated in a modern, clear and understandable language according to the poet himself.

Saeed also published another collection of books entitled "The Prince of Lovers", while Alyan Al-Jaludi and Deeb Al-Akash gave a critical reading of the collection. This book was distinguished by not focusing on one topic, but rather four basic topics, namely patriotism, social sciences, religions, and then poetry. According to critics, this book delved into the depths of the human soul and its human feelings and feelings in times of contentment and winged love in its highest manifestations and meanings. In his critical reading, al-Akash said about this book: “The poet has excelled in the poems of his poetry by moving in rhymes and in a highly articulate language, graceful in meaning and full of weights, in a modern, modern language full of feelings and sensations.”

== List of his works ==
This is a list of the most prominent works of the Jordanian writer and poet Saeed Tayeh:

=== Poetry divans ===
• " Qasayid Hamima "

• " Diwan shier " three parts

• " Qasayid min Alwijdan "

• " Amir Aleashiqin "

=== Poems ===
• "Aqul laha"

• "Tihi ealaa badr albadawr"

• "Uriduk wahdi"

• "Eudi kama ead alrabie"

• "Ard alqadaasati"

• "Badirat al'ahlami"

• "Mukashifat sarihatun"

• "Darb al'akhawati"
